The 2020–21 SLC Twenty20 Tournament was a Twenty20 cricket tournament that was held in Sri Lanka. It took place from 4 to 20 March 2021. Colombo Cricket Club were the defending champions. A total of 26 teams took part in the tournament, split into four groups, with 79 matches being played.

Sinhalese Sports Club and Sri Lanka Army Sports Club reached the final of the tournament, with Sinhalese Sports Club winning the match by 29 runs.

Group stage

Group A

Group B

Group C

Group D

Knockout stage

Quarterfinals

Finals

References

External links
 Series home at ESPN Cricinfo

SLC Twenty20 Tournament
SLC Twenty20 Tournament